Behavioral addiction is a form of addiction that involves a compulsion to engage in a rewarding non-substance-related behavior – sometimes called a natural reward – despite any negative consequences to the person's physical, mental, social or financial well-being. Addiction canonically refers to substance abuse; however, the term's connotation has been expanded to include behaviors that may lead to a reward (such as gambling, eating, or shopping) since the 1990s. A gene transcription factor known as ΔFosB has been identified as a necessary common factor involved in both behavioral and drug addictions, which are associated with the same set of neural adaptations in the reward system.

Psychiatric and medical classifications
Diagnostic models do not currently include the criteria necessary to identify behaviors as addictions in a clinical setting. Behavioral addictions have been proposed as a new class in DSM-5, but the only category included is gambling addiction. Internet gaming addiction is included in the appendix as a condition for further study.

Behavioral addictions, which are sometimes referred to as impulse control disorders, are increasingly recognized as treatable forms of addiction.
The type of excessive behaviors identified as being addictive include gambling, eating, having sexual intercourse, using pornography, computers, video games, internet and digital media, physical exercise, and shopping.

In August 2011, the American Society of Addiction Medicine (ASAM) issued a public statement defining all addiction in terms of brain changes. "Addiction is a primary, chronic disease of brain reward, motivation, memory and related circuitry."

The following excerpts are taken from the organization's FAQs: 

Meanwhile, DSM-5 has deprecated the term "addiction".

Treatment

Behavioral addiction is a treatable condition. Treatment options include psychotherapy and psychopharmacotherapy (i.e., medications) or a combination of both. Cognitive behavioral therapy (CBT) is the most common form of psychotherapy used in treating behavioral addictions; it focuses on identifying patterns that trigger compulsive behavior and making lifestyle changes to promote healthier behaviors. Because cognitive behavioral therapy is considered a short term therapy, the number of sessions for treatment normally ranges from five to twenty. During the session, therapists will lead patients through the topics of identifying the issue, becoming aware of one's thoughts surrounding the issue, identifying any negative or false thinking, and reshaping said negative and false thinking. While CBT does not cure behavioral addiction, it does help with coping with the condition in a healthy way. Currently, there are no medications approved for treatment of behavioral addictions in general, but some medications used for treatment of drug addiction may also be beneficial with specific behavioral addictions. Any unrelated psychiatric disorders should be kept under control, and differentiated from the contributing factors that cause the addiction.

Research

A recent narrative review in 2017 examined the existing literature for studies reporting associations between behavioural addictions (pathological gambling, problematic internet use, problematic online gaming, compulsive sexual behaviour disorder, compulsive buying and exercise addiction) and psychiatric disorders. Overall, there is solid evidence for associations between behavioural addictions and mood disorder, anxiety disorder as well as substance use disorders. Associations between ADHD may be specific to problematic internet use and problematic online gaming. The authors also conclude that most of current research on the association between behavioural addictions and psychiatric disorders has several limitations: they are mostly cross-sectional, are not from representative samples, and are often based on small samples, among others. Especially more longitudinal studies are needed to establish the direction of causation, i.e. whether behavioural addictions are a cause or a consequence of psychiatric disorders.

Biomolecular mechanisms

ΔFosB, a gene transcription factor, has been identified as playing a critical role in the development of addictive states in both behavioral addictions and drug addictions. Overexpression of ΔFosB in the nucleus accumbens is necessary and sufficient for many of the neural adaptations seen in drug addiction; it has been implicated in addictions to alcohol, cannabinoids, cocaine, nicotine, phenylcyclidine, and substituted amphetamines as well as addictions to natural rewards such as sex, exercise, and food.  A recent study also demonstrated a cross-sensitization between drug reward (amphetamine) and a natural reward (sex) that was mediated by ΔFosB.

Besides increased ΔFosB expression in the nucleus accumbens, there are many other correlations in the neurobiology of behavioral addictions with drug addictions.

One of the most important discoveries of addictions has been the drug based reinforcement and, even more important, reward based learning processes. Several structures of the brain are important in the conditioning process of behavioral addiction; these subcortical structures form the brain regions known as the reward system. One of the major areas of study is the amygdala, a brain structure which involves emotional significance and associated learning. Research shows that dopaminergic projections from the ventral tegmental area facilitate a motivational or learned association to a specific behavior. 
Dopamine neurons take a role in the learning and sustaining of many acquired behaviors. Research specific to Parkinson's disease has led to identifying the intracellular signaling pathways that underlie the immediate actions of dopamine. The most common mechanism of dopamine is to create addictive properties along with certain behaviors. There are three stages to the dopamine reward system: bursts of dopamine, triggering of behavior, and further impact to the behavior. Once electronically signaled, possibly through the behavior, dopamine neurons let out a 'burst-fire' of elements to stimulate areas along fast transmitting pathways. The behavior response then perpetuates the striated neurons to further send stimuli. The fast firing of dopamine neurons can be monitored over time by evaluating the amount of extracellular concentrations of dopamine through micro dialysis and brain imaging. This monitoring can lead to a model in which one can see the multiplicity of triggering over a period of time.  Once the behavior is triggered, it is hard to work away from the dopamine reward system.

Behaviors like gambling have been linked to the newfound idea of the brain's capacity to anticipate rewards. The reward system can be triggered by early detectors of the behavior, and trigger dopamine neurons to begin stimulating behaviors. But in some cases, it can lead to many issues due to error, or reward-prediction errors. These errors can act as teaching signals to create a complex behavior task over time.

Varieties
Although many types of behavioral addictions are not formally recognized in medical diagnostic schema, they are the subject of addict mutual aid organizations, rehabilitation programs, clinician associations, research, and many publications, both professional and popular. These include:
Sex addiction
Compulsive spending
Gambling addiction
Food addiction
Workaholism
Codependency

See also
Addictive behavior
Addictive personality

Habit

Notes

References

External links

  Technical review of biomolecular-neurobehavioral research

 
Mass psychogenic illness
Addiction
Conformity
Social influence